Sarah Jane Smith: Comeback is a Big Finish Productions audio drama based on the long-running British science fiction television series Doctor Who, released in 2002. It stars Elisabeth Sladen reprising her role as Sarah Jane Smith.

Plot 
Six months after the last part of her investigative television series for Planet 3 Broadcasting went out, Sarah Jane Smith is running scared. Meeting new friend Josh Townsend, she finds herself investigating mysterious events in the village of Cloots Coombe.

Cast
Sarah Jane Smith – Elisabeth Sladen
Harris – Robin Bowerman
Mr Venables – Alistair Lock
Josh Townsend – Jeremy James
Bank robber – Matthew Brenher
Bank robber – David John
Mr Hedges – Nicholas Briggs
Natalie Redfern – Sadie Miller
The Squire – David Jackson
Rev. Gosforth – Peter Sowerbutts
Ellie Martin – Juliet Warner
Maude – Patricia Leventon

References

External links
Big Finish Productions – Sarah Jane Smith: Comeback

Comeback
2002 audio plays
Plays by Terrance Dicks